Ryszard Tylewski (born 24 February 1952 in Skwierzyna) is a Polish sprint canoer who competed in the mid-1970s. He was eliminated in the semifinals of the K-2 1000 m event at the 1976 Summer Olympics in Montreal.

References
Sports-Reference.com profile

1952 births
Canoeists at the 1976 Summer Olympics
Living people
Olympic canoeists of Poland
Polish male canoeists
People from Skwierzyna
Sportspeople from Lubusz Voivodeship